Høyenhall is a rapid transit station on the Lambertseter Line of the Oslo Metro. Served by Line 4, it is the first station on the Lambertseter Line not shared with any other line.

The station was opened as a tram station in 1957, and as a metro station on 22 May 1966. The architects were Thorvald and Henning Astrup.

References

External links

Oslo Metro stations in Oslo
Railway stations opened in 1957
1957 establishments in Norway